Issac Ryan Brown (born July 12, 2005) is an American actor and singer. He is best known for his portrayal of Booker in the Disney Channel sitcom Raven's Home, which earned him a nomination at the 48th Daytime Emmy Awards for Outstanding Principal Performance in a Children's Program, and his role as the voice of Augustus "Gus" Porter in The Owl House.

Career
Brown was born in Detroit, Michigan. At the age of six, he auditioned for America's Got Talent, performing songs such as Michael Jackson's "One More Chance", but did not advance to the quarter-finals.
 
Brown made his onscreen debut on the Nickelodeon series Sam & Cat. He portrayed Young Dre in various episodes of Black-ish. In the live-action television movie adaptation of the animated series Kim Possible, he portrayed the teenage computer genius Wade.

Brown also works as a voice-over artist. He voiced the lead character, Bingo, in the Disney Junior series Puppy Dog Pals. Additional roles include Goby in Bubble Guppies and Haruna Kitumba in Miles from Tomorrowland. He voiced Stinky in The Stinky & Dirty Show, replacing Jaden Betts. In November 2019, it was announced that Brown would voice Gus Porter in Disney's The Owl House.

Personal life
Brown currently resides in Los Angeles with his family.

Filmography

Film

Television

Web

References

External links

2005 births
African-American male actors
American male child actors
American male film actors
American male television actors
American male voice actors
21st-century American male actors
Living people
Male actors from Detroit
21st-century African-American people